Mayfield Dugout is a historic dugout on private land in Briscoe County, Texas near Silverton.  It was built in 1889.  It was added to the National Register of Historic Places in 1973.

Its roof is supported by three long beams.

See also

National Register of Historic Places listings in Briscoe County, Texas

References

Dugouts
Houses on the National Register of Historic Places in Texas
Houses completed in 1889
Houses in Briscoe County, Texas
National Register of Historic Places in Briscoe County, Texas